Ben Devlin is a British television executive producer. After periods working in journalism including a stint at British newspaper  The Daily Telegraph, he entered television broadcasting and worked for the BBC, Rapido TV, Clive James's Watchmaker Films, Graham Norton's So TV and Visual Voodoo, the entertainment arm of ITN. His credits range from The Generation Game to Eurotrash.

He now specialises in content creation strategies for brands, developing and placing branded content, advertiser funded programming, and product placement in the UK.

Past credits
100 Greatest Stand-Ups - Channel 4
Richard Hammond Meets Evel Knievel - BBC Two
The Million Dollar Mind Reader: Derek Ogilvie - Channel 5
James Hewitt Under Hypnosis - Channel 5
The Jules and Lulu Show - ITV

References

External links
 

British television producers
Living people
Year of birth missing (living people)